The IMOCA 60 Class yacht Solidaires, 50 was designed by Bernard Nivelt and launched in the March 1999 after being built Thierry Dubois in France.

Racing results

Timeline

VM-Matériaux

Great American III

References 

Individual sailing vessels
1990s sailing yachts
Sailboat type designs by Bernard Nivelt
Sailboat types built in France
Vendée Globe boats
IMOCA 60